Zhu Senlin (born October 1930) was the sixth Governor of Guangdong in the history of the People's Republic of China and the mayor of Guangzhou. Born in Chuansha County, Shanghai, Zhu became the acting governor of Guangdong in 1991 and officially in 1993.

References

1930 births
Living people
Governors of Guangdong
Mayors of Guangzhou
People's Republic of China politicians from Shanghai
Chinese Communist Party politicians from Shanghai